Appletons' Journal was an American magazine of literature, science, and arts. Published by D. Appleton & Company and debuting on April 3, 1869, its first editor was Edward L. Youmans, followed by Robert Carter, Oliver Bell Bunce, and Charles Henry Jones. It was published weekly until June 26, 1876, then monthly from July 1876 until its final issue December 1881.

References

External links

Appletons' Journal at HathiTrust

1869 establishments in New York (state)
1881 disestablishments in New York (state)
Monthly magazines published in the United States
Weekly magazines published in the United States
Defunct literary magazines published in the United States
Magazines established in 1869
Magazines disestablished in 1881
Magazines published in New York City